The 1903 Grand National was the 65th renewal of the Grand National horse race that took place at Aintree Racecourse near Liverpool, England, on 27 March 1903.

Finishing Order

Non-finishers

References

 1903
Grand National
Grand National
20th century in Lancashire